Old City Hall in Warsaw – was a town hall in Old Warsaw, which existed between the 15th century until the beginning of the 19th century and was situated in the middle of the Old Town Market Square in Warsaw.

Sources 
 Warszawskie Stare Miasto

Old Town Market Square
Demolished buildings and structures in Poland
Former buildings and structures in Poland
Buildings and structures demolished in 1817